Martine Christine van Leeuwen (born 16 July 1968 in Rotterdam) is a sailor from the Netherlands, who represented her country at the 1992 Summer Olympics in Barcelona in the Europe event. Van Leeuwen took the 7th place.

References

1968 births
Living people
Dutch female sailors (sport)
Olympic sailors of the Netherlands

Sailors at the 1992 Summer Olympics – Europe
Sportspeople from Rotterdam
20th-century Dutch women
21st-century Dutch women